Eterno agosto (English: Eternal August) is the debut studio album by Spanish singer-songwriter Álvaro Soler, first released on June 26, 2015 by Universal Music. Conceived along with musicians Alexander Zuckowski und Simon Triebel, it was mostly recorded in Berlin and features elements of latin pop and folk pop. Preceded by its number-one hit lead single "El mismo sol," Eterno agosto was released to positive reviews from music critics and became a commercial success, peaking atop the album charts in Italy, Poland, and Switzerland. The album also reached the top ten in Austria and Germany.

A major seller, Eterno agosto was certified triple platinum by the Polish Society of the Phonographic Industry (ZPAV) and platinum by the Federazione Industria Musicale Italiana (FIMI), while reaching gold status in Austria and Switzerland, and was reissued in 2016, including a Spanglish version of "El mismo sol" featuring vocals by Jennifer Lopez and its previously unreleased third single "Sofia," produced by RedOne, which became Soler's second number-one hit in Italy and Switzerland.

Track listing
Credits adapted from the liner notes of Eterno Agosto.

Charts

Weekly charts

Year-end charts

Certifications

References

External links
 

2015 debut albums
Álvaro Soler albums
Spanish-language albums
European Border Breakers Award-winning albums